This is a list of cities, towns and villages in Saint Vincent and the Grenadines:

See also
 Parishes of Saint Vincent and the Grenadines
 Grenadines Parish#Islands
 Grenadines#Saint Vincent and the Grenadines
 Geography of Saint Vincent and the Grenadines#Table of Islands

References

Saint Vincent and the Grenadines
 
Cities